Saylor is an unincorporated community in Polk County, in the U.S. state of Iowa.

History
Saylor took its name from Saylor Township. The post office in Saylor was called Marquisville. The Marquisville post office operated from 1892 until 1907.

Saylor's population was 25 in 1925.

References

Unincorporated communities in Polk County, Iowa
1892 establishments in Iowa
Unincorporated communities in Iowa
1907 disestablishments in Iowa